Start was a short-lived daily tabloid published in Belgrade between late 2005 and early 2006.

After the commercial failure of his Ekipa sports daily, Radisav Rodić, owner of Kurir and Glas javnosti dailies, decided to give Start a try in late 2005. The first issue hit the stands on November 1, 2005.

Resembling Kurir in many ways, many wondered about the commercial reasoning behind a launch of yet another tabloid (admittedly, a little less sensationalist) in the highly saturated Serbian daily newspaper media market.

Edited by Milka Ljubičić, in addition to running the usual political, cultural, life, and social sections, Start tried to compete by offering expanded sports coverage, something that most Serbian tabloids don't do. However, it couldn't keep up and the January 24, 2006 issue turned out to be its last.

Defunct newspapers published in Serbia
Publications established in 2005
Publications disestablished in 2006
Mass media in Belgrade